Grabowiec  is a village in the administrative district of Gmina Rzeczniów, within Lipsko County, Masovian Voivodeship, in east-central Poland.

The village has a population of 510.

References

Grabowiec